The 1964 Hofstra Flying Dutchmen football team was an American football team that represented Hofstra College during the 1964 NCAA College Division football season. In its first year competing in the Middle Atlantic Conference, University Division, Hofstra tied for last place.

In their 15th year under head coach Howard "Howdy" Myers Jr., the Flying Dutchmen compiled a 6–3–1 record, and outscored opponents 180 to 135. Don Cummings and Carmine Limone were the team captains. 

After six years playing a mostly non-league schedule while nominally belonging to the less competitive MAC College–Northern Division, Hofstra football moved up to the MAC University Division in time for the start of the 1964 season. Despite posting an overall winning record, however, Hofstra was winless against its new division rivals. The Flying Dutchmen (0–3–1) tied for last place with Lehigh (also 0–3–1) and Lafayette (0–4–2). Hofstra won all of its non-league games.

The Flying Dutchmen played their first full year of home games at Hofstra Stadium in Hempstead on Long Island, New York.

Schedule

References

Hofstra
Hofstra Pride football seasons
Hofstra Flying Dutchmen football